Bechtel is a German surname.

People 
Notable people with this surname include the following:

Bruce Bechtel (born 1955), American race-car driver
Jim Bechtel (born c. 1952), American cotton farmer and poker player
Kenneth K. Bechtel (1904–1978), American industrialist, son of Warren Bechtel
Louise Seaman Bechtel (1894–1985), American author, editor, and critic
Riley P. Bechtel (born 1952), American industrialist, chairman and CEO of the Bechtel Corporation, great-grandson of Warren Bechtel
Stephen Bechtel Jr. (1925–2021), co-owner of the Bechtel Corporation, grandson of Warren Bechtel
Stephen Bechtel Sr. (1900–1989), American industrialist, president of the Bechtel Corporation and son of Warren Bechtel
Warren A. Bechtel (1872–1933), American industrialist, founder of the Bechtel Corporation
William Bechtel (contemporary), American professor of philosophy

Companies 

 Bechtel, an American company founded by Warren A. Bechtel (see above)

See also
Bechdel

References

German-language surnames